The Kerry and Feingold Amendment (June 2006) proposed the withdrawal of American armed forces from Iraq by July 2007 with the exception of a few to maintain security. The proposal was defeated in the United States Senate in an 86 to 13 vote.

Vote Summary
Question: On the Amendment (Kerry Amdt. No. 4442 )
Vote Number: 181
Vote Date: June 22, 2006, 11:07 AM
Required For Majority: 1/2
Vote Result: Amendment Rejected
Amendment Number: S.Amdt. 4442 to S. 2766 (National Defense Authorization Act for Fiscal Year 2007 )

Statement of Purpose
To require the redeployment of United States Armed Forces from Iraq in order to further a political solution in Iraq, encourage the people of Iraq to provide for their own security, and achieve victory in the war on terror.

Vote Counts
YEAs: 13
NAYs: 86
Not Voting: 1

See also 
House Concurrent Resolution 63: Disapproval of troop surge
Iraq Conflict

References

External links 
 U.S. Senate Legislation Record Roll Call Vote

Proposed legislation of the 109th United States Congress
John Kerry